WND (formerly WorldNetDaily) is an American far-right fake news website. It is known for promoting falsehoods and conspiracy theories, including the false claim that former President Barack Obama was not born in the United States.

The site was founded in May 1997 by Joseph Farah, who is its current editor-in-chief and CEO. The website publishes news, editorials, and opinion columns, while also aggregating content from other publications.

History
In 1997 Joseph Farah created the news website WorldNetDaily as a division of the Western Journalism Center. It was subsequently spun off in 1999 as a for-profit organization with the backing of $4.5 million from investors, Farah owning a majority of the stock. The site describes itself as "an independent news company dedicated to uncompromising journalism". In 1999, WorldNetDaily.com, Inc. was incorporated in Delaware with offices in Cave Junction, Oregon.

The website gained notoriety for stoking false "birther" conspiracy theories about President Barack Obama.

In 2018, Farah wrote about WorldNetDailys financial problems, saying it faced an "existential threat." Farah ceased contributing to the site after his March 12, 2019, column; the site announced a few weeks later that he had suffered a major stroke. In April 2019, The Washington Post reported that WorldNetDaily suffered from declining revenue and diminishing readership. Farah blamed the website's financial woes on what he claimed was suppression by powerful technology companies.

Application for congressional press credentials (2002)
Seeking credentials to cover the U.S. Congress in 2002, WND was opposed by the Standing Committee of Correspondents. This panel of journalists is charged by Congress with administering press credentials. Until 1996, Internet-only publications had been deemed unacceptable. WND turned to the United States Senate Committee on Rules and Administration for help, arguing that the panel's decision had violated the site's constitutional rights to due process, equal protection, and freedom of the press. Faced "with legal threats and negative publicity, the panel reversed itself, voting 3–2 to award WND its credentials". Shortly after, the rules were formally adjusted to clarify the participation of online publications.

Ann Coulter speech at Homocon (2010)
In 2010, when Ann Coulter accepted an invitation to attend and speak at GOProud's Homocon 2010 convention, Farah announced the withdrawal of Coulter's name from the list of speakers at the company's 'Taking America Back' conference. Coulter responded by saying that speaking engagements do not imply endorsement of the hosting organization.

Content
The WND website provides news, editorials, letters to the editor, forums, videos and conducts a daily poll. Its CEO Joseph Farah has said that WND provides "the broadest spectrum of opinion anywhere in the news business", but acknowledges "some misinformation by columnists". WND'''s content is predominantly conservative. Besides providing articles written by its own staff, the site links to news from other publications.WNDs political lean has been described as alt-right and far-right. WND has promoted the white genocide conspiracy theory. The Southern Poverty Law Center (SPLC) labels WND an anti-government extremist group.

Anthony C. LoBaido commentary on September 11 attacks (2001)
On September 13, 2001, WND published an opinion article by Anthony C. LoBaido regarding the September 11 attacks on New York City and Washington, D.C., that had occurred two days earlier. In his column, LoBaido described what he said was the moral depravity of America in general and New York in particular, asking whether "God (has) raised up Shiite Islam as a sword against America". Commentators Virginia Postrel of Reason magazine and James Taranto of the Wall Street Journal criticized LoBaido and Joseph Farah for the piece and called for columnists Hugh Hewitt and Bill O'Reilly to sever their ties with WND. Founder Farah responded with his own column, saying that LoBaido's opinion piece did not reflect the viewpoint of WND, and that it, like most other commentary pieces, had not been reviewed before publication.

Barack Obama citizenship conspiracy theoriesWND has published hundreds of articles promoting "birther" conspiracy theories about President Barack Obama's U.S. citizenship, for which it has gained notoriety. It says that Obama is not a natural-born US citizen and thus is not eligible to serve as president. After the 2008 presidential campaign, WND began an online petition to have Obama's Hawaiian birth certificate released to the public. The website also unsuccessfully urged Supreme Court justices to hear several lawsuits aiming to release Obama's birth certificate. The White House released copies of the president's original long-form birth certificate on April 27, 2011. After the long-form birth certificate was released, WND continued to promote its conspiracy theory, publishing an article questioning the certificate's authenticity.

Advertisement featuring Neil Patrick Harris (2013)
In January 2013, a WorldNetDaily article criticized a Super Bowl XLVII advertisement in which Neil Patrick Harris had an eye black with "Feb 3 2013" written on it. The website accused Harris of "mocking Christianity." Quarterback Tim Tebow was known for inscribing Bible verses with eye black to wear during NFL games. But, a similar advertisement by Beyoncé for the Super Bowl had not been criticized. In a later Twitter post by Harris about the Super Bowl, he used the hashtag "#noagenda".

Russian interference in US politics

On August 7, 2017, WorldNetDaily published "The 8 Dirtiest Scandals of Robert Mueller No One Is Talking About" which was pushed out by Elena Khusyaynova's operation, targeting the Mueller investigation.

 COVID-19 misinformation 
In April 2020, the SPLC reported that WND "has boosted a number of articles featuring antisemitic dog whistles, fake cures and other disinformation" about COVID-19, with headlines such as "Coronavirus is being weaponized by Soros, others behind anti-Trump ads", "Clyburn: Democrats must use Chinese virus to restructure America 'to fit our vision'" and "Newt Gingrich's question for Biden exposes Obama's undeniable role in N95 mask shortage". Another headline proclaimed that a three-drug cocktail promoted by Vladimir Zelenko had a "100% success" rate in treating 350 COVID-19 patients.

A 2020 study by researchers from Northeastern, Harvard, Northwestern and Rutgers universities found that WND was among the top 5 most shared fake news domains in tweets related to COVID-19, the others being The Gateway Pundit, InfoWars, Judicial Watch and Natural News.

ProductsWND publishes books under the imprint WND Books. The imprint was launched in 2002. WNDs imprint publishing partner was Christian publishing house Thomas Nelson Publishers (2002–2004). Cumberland House Publishing (2004–2007), and conservative publisher World Ahead Publishing (2007). In 2008, WND acquired World Ahead Media.WND Books has published books written by right-wing politicians and pundits such as Katherine Harris, former Secretary of State of Florida in office in 2000 during the presidential election under Governor Jeb Bush; commentator Michael Savage; conspiracy theorist Jerome Corsi; ex-congressman Tom Tancredo; and former Ohio Secretary of State Ken Blackwell. In October 2009, WND Books published Muslim Mafia: Inside the Secret Underworld That's Conspiring to Islamize America by Paul David Gaubatz and Paul Sperry. In April 2011, Paul Harris, writing for The Guardian, described WND Books as "a niche producer of rightwing conspiracy theories, religious books and 'family values' tracts."WND also publishes a printed magazine, Whistleblower. It operates other companies such as the G2 Bulletin, a subscription-only website described as an "intelligence resource" for "insights into geo-political and geo-strategic developments".

The WND website also sells survivalist gear.

 Reception 
The SPLC has accused WND of "peddling white nationalism," due to its publication of a series of articles on "black mob violence" by writer Colin Flaherty. It accused the website of being a source of "anti-government conspiracy theories, gay-bashing, anti-Muslim propaganda, and End Times prophecy".

In a related Huffington Post article, Terry Krepel of ConWebWatch.com states WND tried to "cash in on Paula Deen's racism".

 Litigation 
Clark Jones libel lawsuit (2000–2008)
On September 20, 2000, WND published an article saying that Clark Jones, a Savannah, Tennessee car dealer, a fund-raiser for then-Vice President Al Gore in his presidential campaign, had interfered with a criminal investigation, had been a "subject" of a criminal investigation, and was listed on law enforcement computers as a "dope dealer." It implied that he had ties to others involved in alleged criminal activity. The authors later put forward the theory that the publication of this article, as well as other WND articles that were critical of Gore, contributed significantly to Gore losing his home state of Tennessee that November.

In 2001, Clark Jones filed a lawsuit against WND; the reporters, Charles C. Thompson II and Tony Hays; the Center for Public Integrity, which had underwritten Thompson and Hays' reporting on the article and related ones; and various Tennessee publications and broadcasters whom he accused of repeating the claim, arguing these entities had committed libel and defamation. The lawsuit was scheduled to go to trial in March 2008; but, on February 13, 2008, WND announced that a confidential out-of-court settlement had been reached with Jones. A settlement statement jointly drafted by all parties in the lawsuit stated that a Freedom of Information Act request showed that the allegations had been false, and that WND had misquoted sources.

 Staff 
Notable staff members include Jerusalem Bureau Chief Aaron Klein, former White House correspondent Lester Kinsolving, and staff writer Jerome Corsi. Its commentary pages feature editorials by the site's founder Joseph Farah, as well as by commentators including 2016 Republican presidential candidate Ben Carson, Pat Buchanan, Ann Coulter, David Limbaugh, Chuck Norris, Walter E. Williams, Ilana Mercer, Bill Press, and Nat Hentoff.

In February 2020, Right Wing Watch reported that Michael J. Thompson, who worked in WND's marketing department, had also worked at white nationalist publications such as VDARE and American Renaissance under the pseudonym of "Paul Kersey". It found that his position at WND allowed him to move in professional circles that included white nationalists, writers at Breitbart News and The Daily Caller'', and prominent Trump supporters such as Steve Bannon and Jack Posobiec.

References

External links 

 

Alt-right websites
American conservative websites
American news websites
Conspiracist media
Criticism of journalism
Internet properties established in 1997
News agencies based in the United States
Political organizations based in the United States
Fake news websites